Vanover is a surname. Notable people with the surname include:

Larry Vanover (born 1955), American baseball umpire
Roscoe Vanover (1863–1927), American judge
Tamarick Vanover (born 1974), American football player